Tar was an American post-hardcore band, formed in 1988 in Chicago. Throughout their career they released four studio albums, two extended plays, and a number of singles before breaking up in 1995. They were known for their dry sense of humor.

History
The precursor to Tar was a hardcore punk outfit called Blatant Dissent, which formed in DeKalb, Illinois where singer/guitarist John Mohr and drummer Mike Greenlees were attending Northern Illinois University.  Joining Mohr and Greenlees in Tar were original bassist Tim Mescher (only until 1991 and who also played for Snailboy), bassist Tom Zaluckyj and guitarist Mark Zablocki. Zaluckyj and Mohr played unique instruments, crafted of aluminum, designed by Ian Schneller of Specimen Products.

The band released albums on the Amphetamine Reptile and Touch and Go Records labels before disbanding in 1995. During its career, the band released a total of five singles, four albums, two mini albums, and contributed songs to six compilations and split singles.  The band toured nationally and internationally with bands such as Jawbox, Arcwelder, and the Jesus Lizard. In 1994 the band made the decision to call it quits after releasing one final album. Over and Out was written and recorded over a period of a year and a half, produced by the band and engineered by Steve Albini and Bob Weston, and released in 1995.

Tar reunited for a one-off performance at the PRF BBQ 2012 festival in Chicago, and later in the year, as opening act for Shellac at Lincoln hall in Chicago. In 2013, a double vinyl disc compilation titled 1988-1995 was released through Chunklet Magazine, limited to 150 gold colored copies that included download cards. The group would reunite again in 2017 to perform at the All Tomorrow's Impeachments festival.

Discography

Studio albums
Roundhouse (Amphetamine Reptile Records, 1990)
Jackson (Amphetamine Reptile Records, 1991)
Toast (Touch and Go Records, 1993)
Over and Out (Touch and Go Records, 1995)

Compilation albums
1988-1995 (Chunklet Magazine, 2013)

Extended plays
Handsome (Amphetamine Reptile Records, 1989)
Clincher (Touch and Go Records, 1993)

Singles
 "Play to Win" b/w "Mel's" (No Blow Records, 1988, NBLW01)
 "Flow Plow" b/w "Hand" (Amphetamine Reptile Records, 1989, SCALE25)
 "Solution 8" b/w "Non-Alignment Pact" (Amphetamine Reptile Records, 1991, ARR153)
 "Static" split 7-inch with Jawbox (Touch and Go Records/ Dischord Records, 1992, DIS 77.7/TG113.3)
 "Teetering" b/w "The In Crowd" (Touch and Go Records, 1992, TG104)
 "Feel This" b/w "Hell's Bells" (Chunklet Magazine, 2012, CHK7-001)

References

External links
 [ AMG profile page]
 Touch and Go Records page
 Southern Records page
 Trouser Press page
 PRF BBQ 2012 Reunion Performance

American post-hardcore musical groups
Amphetamine Reptile Records artists
Musical groups from Chicago
Musical groups established in 1988
Musical groups disestablished in 1995
Touch and Go Records artists